Charles Roden Buxton (27 November 1875 – 16 December 1942) was an English philanthropist and radical British Liberal Party politician who later joined the Labour Party. He survived an assassination attempt during a mission to the Balkans in 1914.

Early life

He was born in London, the third son of Sir Thomas Buxton, 3rd Baronet. His elder brother Noel Buxton was a prominent figure in British politics, as was his cousin Sidney Buxton.

He grew up on the family estate in Essex and was educated at Harrow and Trinity College, Cambridge, taking a first in Classics and becoming president of the Cambridge Union. After leaving university he travelled to South Australia, where his father was Governor, as well as other locations in France, the Far East, India and America.

He took up law and was called to the bar in 1902. He gave lectures at Morley College and was principal there from 1902 to 1910. He wrote articles on various subjects and edited the Albany Review from 1906 to 1908.

In 1904 he married Dorothy Frances Jebb. The Jebbs, apart from being a well-off family, also had a strong social conscience and commitment to public service; her mother, Eglantyne Louisa Jebb, had founded the Home Arts and Industries Association, to promote Arts and Crafts among young people in rural areas, her sister Louisa would help found the Women's Land Army in World War I, and Dorothy and her sister Eglantyne Jebb co-founded the international charity and movement Save the Children.

The Buxtons lived a frugal lifestyle - on their walking tours in the south of England, they were sometimes mistaken for tramps - and moved to Kennington, a working class area of London. They had two children and later moved to the more affluent area of Golders Green.

Political career

He stood as a Liberal candidate in Hertford in 1906 and Ashburton in 1908. Eventually he was elected as a Member of Parliament in Ashburton in 1910 but lost his seat in the second election of that year. In 1914 he, along with his brother Noel, was his way to Bulgaria. They had stopped in  Bucharest, Romania in October 1914. While there,  an assassination attempt was made on them, by Turkish activist, Hasan Tahsin. He was shot through the lung, but survived. His brother also was wounded in the jaw. Tashsin was captured and sent to prison for five years.

During the First World War, he was one of the minority arguing for a negotiated peace and was a founder member of the Union of Democratic Control. 

In 1917, he left the Liberal Party and joined the Independent Labour Party. As secretary to the Labour Party's delegation to the Soviet Union in 1920, he was very impressed by what he saw, and wrote a book about it, In A Russian Village (1922). 

1918 he contested Accrington for the Labour Party and lost, won the seat in 1922, and lost again in 1923. He won the seat of Elland in 1929, but was defeated in 1931 and 1935.

Buxton was always much more effective behind the scenes, acting as policy advisor on foreign and colonial issues to the Labour Party. He showed particular interest in the rights of indigenous people of Africa, and travelled widely in the continent.

Another of his interests was Esperanto, becoming president of the international society of Quaker Esperantists.

With Dorothy, he became a member of the Society of Friends. They were eager campaigners for peace, and were critical of what they perceived as the unfairness to Germany of the treaty of Versailles. 
Shortly before the outbreak of World War II they still argued that peace could be attained by responding to German grievances. The outbreak of war was a great disappointment to them both.

Last years and death

Charles retired from politics in 1939 and lived in his daughter's house in Peaslake, Surrey, where he died and was buried in 1942. Although he had two children, he left most of his estate to charity.

See also
 List of peace activists

Notes

References
 
 V. A. B. De Bunsen, Charles Roden Buxton: a memoir (1948)
 The Times, obituary of Charles Roden Buxton, 17 December 1942

External links 
 
Buxton papers at London School of Economics (LSE) Archives

Labour Party (UK) MPs for English constituencies
Independent Labour Party MPs
Independent Labour Party National Administrative Committee members
Liberal Party (UK) MPs for English constituencies
Alumni of Trinity College, Cambridge
Presidents of the Cambridge Union
People educated at Harrow School
English Quakers
1875 births
1942 deaths
UK MPs 1910
UK MPs 1922–1923
UK MPs 1929–1931
English Esperantists
Younger sons of baronets
Charles
Members of the Parliament of the United Kingdom for Ashburton
Members of the Parliament of the United Kingdom for constituencies in Lancashire